The 1997 Critérium du Dauphiné Libéré was the 49th edition of the cycle race and was held from 8 June to 15 June 1997. The race started in Grenoble and finished in Chambéry. The race was won by Udo Bölts of Team Telekom.

Teams
Fifteen teams, containing a total of 120 riders, participated in the race:

Route

Stages

Prologue
8 June 1997 – Grenoble,  (ITT)

Stage 1
9 June 1997 – Grenoble to Villeurbanne,

Stage 2
10 June 1997 – Champagne-au-Mont-d'Or to Le Puy-en-Velay,

Stage 3
11 June 1997 – Le Puy-en-Velay to Beaumes-de-Venise,

Stage 4
12 June 1997 – Bédarrides to Bédarrides,  (ITT)

Stage 5
13 June 1997 – Cavaillon to Digne-les-Bains,

Stage 6
14 May 1997 – Digne-les-Bains to Briançon,

Stage 7
15 June 1997 – Briançon to Chambéry,

General classification

References

Further reading

1997
1997 in French sport
June 1997 sports events in Europe